Ann Lorraine Davies known as Ann Lindsay (2 October 1914 – 9 January 1954) was a British actress and translator.

Life
Davies was born in Cardiff in 1914 to Sarah Ann and Morgan Davies, as one of five children. She went to school locally, before going on to University College, Cardiff in 1932. There she was vice President of the Students Union and toured America in the 1936 Welsh Hockey team. Her degree was in French, and she became a clerk at Harrods whilst appearing as Robin Hood (the Principal Boy) in the Unity Theatre's political version of Babes in the Wood, which lampooned Neville Chamberlain's appeasement policy and had Davies in a Russian uniform. The production ran for seven months and Montagu Slater credited the play with making political change.

She volunteered to help Basque children and the League of Nations. Davies also had strong links to the communists, and one person described her as the party's "almost pin-up". She went to work for Randall Swingler, who was in partnership with Jack Lindsay; she had an affair with Swingler.

In 1940, she was involved with organising the People's Convention that was proposed by the Communist Party of Great Britain, on the arts and entertainment committee. The convention took place in Manchester in February 1941.

She was named as secretary of Newport Communications, a company formed by Swingler to manipulate paper rations. Davies rose to lead the company. In October 1942, she also became the first woman to be president of the Unity Theatre.

In 1943 she settled down with Lindsay; she took the name Ann Lindsay, but they never married. Her partner already had a wife he had left in Australia in 1926. After the war, they both toured Russia and nearby countries together. They moved from London to Castle Hedingham in Essex in 1951.

Davies died at their home in Castle Hedingham after further surgery to remove her ovaries, having completed her translation of Émile Zola's novel The Earth.

References

1914 births
1954 deaths
Actresses from Cardiff
Welsh translators
Translators of Émile Zola
20th-century British translators